WMED may refer to:

 WMED (FM), a radio station (89.7 FM) licensed to Calais, Maine, United States
 WMED-TV, a television station (channel 13) licensed to Calais, Maine, United States